National Geographic Channel Korea is a Korean language documentary television channel in the United States operated by Radio Korea Media Group under the license. Launched on November 18, 2009, the channel broadcasts documentary and factual films and series supplied from the National Geographic Society for most of time, either dubbed or subtitled in Korean. It also broadcasts South Korean and other Korean language productions in occasion.

On October 24, 2022, the channel ceased operations, since Radio Korea's licensing deal with the National Geographic Society was not renewed.

See also
 National Geographic (South Korean TV channel): a defunct South Korean television channel directly operated by National Geographic Global Networks

References

External links
 

Television channels and stations established in 2009
Television channels and stations disestablished in 2022
Foreign-language television stations in the United States
Korean-language mass media in the United States
Korean-language television
Television networks in the United States
National Geographic (American TV channel)